Partido Socialista is Spanish and Portuguese for "Socialist Party". Used as a proper noun without any other adjectives, it may refer to:

 Socialist Party (Argentina)
 Socialist Party (Bolivia, 1971)
 Socialist Party of Chile
 Socialist Party (Guatemala)
 Socialist Party (Panama)
 Socialist Party (Peru)
 Socialist Party (Portugal)
 Socialist Party of Uruguay
 Partido Socialista de Puerto Rico
 Partido Socialista Puertorriqueño

See also
 Socialist Party (disambiguation)